Jalan Tanjung Ipoh-Senaling (Negeri Sembilan state route N24 ) is a major road in Negeri Sembilan, Malaysia. It is one of two roads that leads to Seri Menanti, the other being Jalan Terachi-Seri Menanti . Unlike the N29, this road continues on from Seri Menanti to Ulu Pilah, ending at Senaling, meeting with the Federal Route 9 .

List of junctions

Roads in Negeri Sembilan